This list contains people both born in Erfurt and notable residents of the city, ordered chronologically.

Born in Erfurt, Germany 
The following persons were born in Erfurt respectively within the current city borders.

14th century 
 Alexander Suslin (died before 1349), rabbi

15th century 
 Erhard Etzlaub (1460–1532), astronomer
 de:Johannes Lang (c. 1487–1548), theologian; the "Reformer of Erfurt"
 Henricus Grammateus (1495–1526), mathematician

16th century 
 Michael Altenburg (1584–1640), theologian, born in Alach
 Johannes Thesselius (1590–1643), composer

17th century 

 Johannes Bach (1604–1673), composer
 Hiob Ludolf (1624–1704), orientalist
 Johann Michael Vansleb (1635–1679), theologian
 Maria Elisabeth Lämmerhirt (1644–1694), mother of Johann Sebastian Bach
 Johann Aegidius Bach (1645–1716), organist
 Johann Ambrosius Bach (1645–1695), musician
 Johann Christoph Bach (1645–1693), musician
 Johann Heinrich Buttstett (1666–1727), composer, born in Bindersleben
 Johann Christoph Bach (1671–1721), composer
 Johann Bernhard Bach (1676–1749), composer
 Johann Gottfried Walther (1684–1748), music theorist
 Wilhelm Hieronymus Pachelbel (1685–1764), composer
 Elias David Häusser (1687–1745), architect 
 Amalia Pachelbel (1688–1723), painter
 Jakob Adlung (1699–1762), organist, born in Bindersleben

18th century 

 Johann Rudolf Engau (1708–1755), jurist
 Sidonia Hedwig Zäunemann (1711–1740), poet
 Johann Christian Kittel (1732–1809), composer
 Johann Hieronymus Schröter (1745–1816), astronomer
 Johann Wilhelm Hässler (1747–1822), composer
 Samuel Gottlieb Vogel (1750–1837), physician
 Rudolph Zacharias Becker (1752–1822), educator 
 Johann Joachim Bellermann (1754–1842), theologist
 Wilhelm Gottlieb Tennemann (1761–1819), historian
 Johann Trommsdorff (1770–1837), chemist
 Johann Jakob Bernhardi (1774–1850), botanist
 Justus Hecker (1795–1850), physician

19th century 

 August Soller (1805–1853), architect and Schinkel student
 Christian Eduard Langethal (1806–1878), botanist
 Hugo Rothstein (1810–1865), officer
 August Gottfried Ritter (1811–1885), composer and organist
 Anton Dominik Fernkorn (1813–1878), sculptor
 Eduard Gerhardt (1813–1888), painter, draftsman, printmaker, lithographer and architect
 Ferdinand Bellermann (1814–1889), landscape painter
 Fritz Müller (1821–1897), biologist, born in Windischholzhausen
 Carl Reinthaler (1822–1896), composer, conductor and director of the cathedral choir in Bremen
 Oskar Schade (1826–1906), philologist
 Otto Ribbeck (1827–1898), classical scholar 
 Julius Grosse (1828–1902), writer and theater critic
 Alfred Kirchhoff (1838–1907), geographer
 Carl von Thieme (1844–1924), co-founder of two large German insurance companies Munich reinsurance company and Allianz AG
 Bernhard Ziehn (1845–1912), music theorist
 Paul von Kleist (1846–1926), Prussian lieutenant general
 Johann Heinrich Hübschmann (1848–1908), philologist
 Günther von Kirchbach (1850–1925), general
 Oskar von Hutier (1857–1934), General in World War I
 Max Weber (1864–1920), sociologist, lawyer, economist and social economist
 Johannes Franz Hartmann (1865–1936), astronomer
 Hermann Kiese (1865–1923), rosarian, born in Vieselbach
 Alfred Weber (1868–1958), economist, sociologist and cultural philosopher
 Paul Lipke (1870–1955), chess master
 Max E. Binner (born 1883), politician
 Hubert Weise (1884–1950), general
 Erich Zeigner (1886–1949) politician (SPD/SED), prime minister of Saxony 21 March to 29 October 1923
 Willi Münzenberg (1889–1940), communist, publisher and film producer
 Erika Glässner (1890–1959), actress
 Erich Köhler (1892–1958), politician (CDU), president of the Bundestag from 1949 to 1950
 Walter Zander (1898–1993), lawyer

20th century

1900s 

 Werner Danckert (1900–1970), musicologist
 Reinhard Gehlen (1902–1979), German general, first president of Federal Intelligence Service 
 Hans Hess (1907–1975), museologist
 Margaretha Reichardt (1907–1984), textile designer and Bauhaus alumni
 Hans Günther (1910–1945), policeman, Sturmbannführer and head of the  Central office for Jewish emigration in Prague

1910s 
 Max Lackmann (1910–2000), ecumenist
 Heinrich Schonder (1910–1943), U-boat commander
 Hans Fleischhacker (1912–1992), anthropologist, born in Töttleben
 Gerhard Schöpfel (1912–2003), flying ace
 Rolf Günther (1913–1945), major in SS

1920s 
 Annemarie Schimmel (1922–2003), orientalist
 Wolf Schneider (1925–2022), journalist, nonfiction author and language critic
 Peer Schmidt (1926–2010), actor
 Gert Schramm (1928–2016), survivor of Buchenwald concentration camp 
 Winfried Herz (born 1929), footballer
 Reinhard Lettau (1929–1996), writer

1930s 
 Johannes Wallmann (born 1930), professor of church history at the University of Bochum, pietism researcher
 Georg Stoltze (1931–2007), cyclist
Wilhelm Brückner (born 1932), luthier
 Jutta Langenau (1933–1982), swimmer
 Lothar Stäber (born 1936), cyclist
 Lothar Ahrendt (born 1936), politician (SED), from 1989 to 1990 Minister of the Interior of the GDR
 Joachim Wendler (1939–1975), aquanaut

1940s 
 Alexander Lang (born 1941), director and actor
 Gerd Nauhaus (born 1942), musicologist
 Wolfgang Scheidel (born 1943), luger
 Boris Gulko (born 1947), Grandmaster in chess
 Christine Westermann (born 1948), television host and author
 Christel Augenstein (born 1949), politician, 2001-2009 mayor of Pforzheim
 Ralf Schulenberg (born 1949), footballer

1950s 
 Klaus Wunder (born 1950), footballer
 Jochen Babock (born 1953), bobsledder
 Ulrich Holbein (born 1953), writer
 Ute Lubosch (born 1953), actress
 Joachim Werneburg (born 1953), writer
 Evelyn Stolze (born 1954), swimmer

1960s 
 Sabine Busch (born 1962), athlete
 Carsten Sänger (born 1962), football player 
 Stefan Böger (born 1966), football player and coach
 Axel Kühn (born 1967), bobsledder
 Maik Landsmann (born 1967), cyclist and Olympic champion
 Sybille Gruner (born 1969), handball player
 Thomas Luther (born 1969), Grandmaster in chess
 Eyck Zimmer (born 1969), award-winning chef

1970s 
 Thomas Rudolph (born 1970), luger
 Christoph Genz (born 1971), tenor
 Andreas Müller (born 1971), paralympic athlete
 Marco Weißhaupt (born 1972), footballer
 Steffen Wöller (born 1972), luger
 Katrin Apel (born 1973), biathlete
 Andreas Bausewein (born 1973), politician (SPD) and mayor of Erfurt
 Alexander Beyer (born 1973), film actor  (Good Bye Lenin, The Legend of Rita, Sonnenallee)
 André Korff (born 1973), cyclist
 Erik Niedling (born 1973), artist
 Sabine Völker (born 1973), speed skater
 Daniela Anschütz-Thoms (born 1974), speed skater and Olympic champion
 Franziska Schenk (born 1974), speed skater
 Marco Schreyl (born 1974), television host
 Matthias Höpfner (born 1975), bobsledder
 Carsten Schneider (born 1976), politician (SPD), Member of Bundestag since 1998
 Daniel Becke (born 1978), cyclist
 Anja Schneiderheinze-Stöckel (born 1978), bobsledder
 Stephan Schreck (born 1978), cyclist
 René Wolff (born 1978), cyclist
 Yvonne Catterfeld (born 1979), singer and actress
 Silvio Smalun (born 1979), figure skater

1980s 
 Clueso (born 1980) (a.k.a. Thomas Hübner), singer 
 Clemens Fritz (born 1980), footballer
 Stefan Lindemann (born 1980), figure skater
 Andreas Pohle (born 1981), long jumper and triple jumper
 Janin Reinhardt (born 1981), television presenter and actress
 Judith Hesse (born 1982), speed skater
 Christian Müller (born 1982), cyclist
 Simon Schwartz (born 1982), illustrator and comic novel writer 
 Robert Lehmann (born 1984), speed skater
 Elisabeth Pähtz (born 1985), Grandmaster in chess 
 Martin Ullmann (born 1986), footballer
 Kristin Wieczorek (born 1986), figure skater
 Patrick Gretsch (born 1987), cyclist
 Stephanie Beckert (born 1988), speed skater
 Thomas Ströhl (born 1988), footballer
 Christian Beck (born 1988), football player

1990s 
 Patrick Beckert (born 1990), speed skater
 Denis Wieczorek (born 1991), figure skater
 Florian Wünsche (born 1991), actor
 Kevin Möhwald (born 1993), footballer
 Silvano Varnhagen (born 1993), footballer

Notable residents of Erfurt 
 Eoban (died 754), martyr, buried in Erfurt
 Eleazar of Worms (1176–1238), taldmudist, worked as hazzan in Erfurt
 de:Heinrich von Friemar (the elder) (c. 1245–1340), an Augustinian monk, philosopher, theologian and aesthetic writer.
 Meister Eckhart (c.1260–1327), theologian, lived in Erfurt
 Heinrich von Friemar (the younger) (c. 1285–1354) Augustinian monk and theologian
 Johannes de Indagine (c.1415–1475), Carthusian monk and theologian
 Jacob Weil (died before 1456), rabbinate in Erfurt
 Martin Luther (1483–1546), lived as student and later as a monk in Erfurt
 Adam Ries (1492–1559), mathematician, worked in Erfurt between 1518 and 1522/23
 Justus Jonas (1493–1555), Lutheran theologian and Rector of University of Erfurt.
 Johannes Loersfeld (fl. 1520s), printer, worked in Erfurt in the 1520s
 Basil Faber (1520–1576), schoolmaster, worked in Erfurt between 1571 and 1576
 Christoph Bach (1613–1661), worked in Erfurt between 1642 and 1652
 Heinrich Bach (1615–1692), organist, worked in Erfurt
 Johann Pachelbel (1653–1706), composer and organist, worked in Erfurt between 1678 and 1690
 Andreas Armsdorff (1670–1699), composer, worked in Erfurt
 Karl Theodor Anton Maria von Dalberg (1744–1817), governor of Erfurt
 Paulus Stephanus Cassel (1821–1892), writer, lived in Erfurt
 Emil Büchner (1826–1908), conductor
 Moritz Callmann Wahl (1829–1887), writer, lived in Erfurt
 Ernst Dircksen (1831–1899), architect, lived in Erfurt since 1890
 Richard Wetz (1875–1935), composer, lived in Erfurt since 1906
 Joel Brand (1906–1964), zionist, grew up in Erfurt
 Walter Werneburg (1922–1999), artist, lived in Erfurt
 Hans-Joachim Göring (1923–2010), footballer, lived in Erfurt
 Joachim Meisner (born 1933), cardinal
 Paul Friedrichs (1940–2012), motocross racer, lived in Erfurt
 Gunda Niemann-Stirnemann (born 1966), speed skater
 Marcus Urban (born 1971), footballer with FC Rot-Weiß Erfurt

 
Erfurt
Erfurt